The 2019 Arema F.C. season is Arema's 30th competitive season. The club will compete in Indonesia League 1, Piala Indonesia and Indonesia President's Cup. Arema Football Club a professional football club based in Malang, East Java, Indonesia. The season covers the period from 1 January 2019 to 31 December 2019.

Squad information

First team squad

Transfers

In

Out

Pre-seasons and friendlies

Friendlies

Indonesia President's Cup

Group stage

Knockout phase

Match results

Liga 1

Matches

League table

Piala Indonesia

Statistics

Squad appearances and goals

|-
! colspan=14 style=background:#dcdcdc; text-align:center|Goalkeepers

|-
! colspan=14 style=background:#dcdcdc; text-align:center|Defenders

|-
! colspan=14 style=background:#dcdcdc; text-align:center|Midfielders

|-
! colspan=14 style=background:#dcdcdc; text-align:center|Forwards

|-
! colspan=14 style=background:#dcdcdc; text-align:center|Players transferred or loaned out during the season the club 
 
 
|-
|}

Top scorers
The list is sorted by shirt number when total goals are equal.

Notes

References 

Arema
Arema